Once Upon a Dream is the second album by Detroit, Michigan-based R&B group Enchantment. The album was remastered and reissued with bonus tracks in 2012 by Big Break Records.

Covers
"Silly Love Song" was covered in 1989 by Michel'le on her debut album produced by Dr. Dre.

Track listing

Personnel
Michael Stokes - Piano, Clavinet, Synthesizer, Electric Piano, Harpsichord, Synthesizer
Jeff Mironov, John Tropea, Ken Bushell, Lance Quinn, Robert Lowe - Guitar
Patrick Rebillot  - Keyboards
Neil Jason, Will Lee - Bass
Allan Schwartzberg - Drums
Jack Brokenshaw, Carl Small - Percussion
Carl Austin, The Detroit Symphony Orchestra, John Trudell - Strings, Horns

Production
Mastering by George Marino at Sterling Sound, NYC

Chart performance
Released in 1977, the album charted at number eight on the R&B albums chart in 1978. The crossover ballad, "It's You That I Need", reached number one on the R&B singles chart, while "If You're Ready (Here It Comes)" came in at number fourteen on the R&B chart.

Album

Singles

References

External links
 

1978 albums
Enchantment (band) albums
United Artists Records albums